In the run–up to the 2021 Danish local elections, multiple organisations carried out opinion polling for the city and regional councils for some of the 98 municipalities of Denmark and 5 regions of Denmark. Results of the some of the polls are displayed below.

The date range for these opinion polls are from the previous local elections, held on 21 November 2017 until the election on 16 November 2021.

By percentage

Bornholm

Copenhagen

Fredericia

Hedensted

Herning

Odense

By seats

Horsens

Vejle

References 

Opinion polling in Denmark